Nummular keratitis is a feature of viral keratoconjunctivitis. It is a common feature of adenoviral keratoconjunctivitis (an ocular adenovirus infection), as well as approximately 1/3rd of cases of Herpes Zoster Ophthalmicus infections. It represents the presence of anterior stromal infiltrates. Unilateral or bilateral subepithelial lesions of the cornea may be present. Slit lamp examination reveals multiple tiny granular deposits surrounded by a halo of stromal haze. After healing, residual 'nummular scars' often remain. Disciform keratitis occurs in 50% of individuals with Nummular keratitis, but Nummular keratitis always precedes Disciform keratitis.

Treatment
 Topical NSAIDS 
 Lubricating eye drops
 Topical dilute steroid drops in tapering doses (debatable, see: Adenoviral keratoconjunctivitis)

References

Ophthalmology
Ophthalmology task force articles